The Palei languages constitute a branch of the Torricelli language family according to Laycock (1975) (quoted from Foley 2018). They are spoken in mountainous regions of eastern Sandaun Province, Papua New Guinea.

Languages
Languages are:

Nuclear Palai
Braget, Amol (Aru), Aruop (Srenge)
Aiku (Yangum), Ambrak
West Palai
Agi, Yeri (Yapunda) [perhaps a Wapei language]
? Walman [perhaps a Wapei language]
? Kayik (Wanap)

Nambi (Nabi) = Metan may also belong here, or may be one of the Maimai languages, or separate within the Torricelli languages.

Pronouns
Pronouns in Palei languages are:

{| 
|+ Palei pronouns
!  !! Kayik !! Aru !! Aruop !! Aiku !! Nambi
|-
! 1s
| kəmex || au || am || wup || ai
|-
! 2s
| kiyox || i || yi || yit || yi
|-
! 3s
| təno ||  || din || tuwun || 
|-
! 1p
| kupox || amən || mendi || miyan || ep
|-
! 2p
| kinox || yi || yimi || yip || yip
|-
! 3p
| təmo || may || dim || ti || rəm
|}

Vocabulary comparison
The following basic vocabulary words are from Laycock (1968), as cited in the Trans-New Guinea database. Nabi words are from Laycock (1968) and Voorhoeve (1971, 1975).

{| class="wikitable sortable"
! gloss !! Aruop !! Agi !! Amol !! Nabi !! Wanap !! Yangum Mon
|-
! head
| wantu || paikwa ||  || wotuf || peləf || wah
|-
! ear
| yaŋkole || muᶇkwalnta || taŋkən || kik || nuŋkul || yiŋkuːl
|-
! eye
| yolta || juwol || nəmalal || nampəkat || yilp || yilkŋum
|-
! nose
| mup || tuwarka || mipan || minif || təlom || yimwar
|-
! tooth
| na || nai || owayen || naf || nef || awak
|-
! tongue
| aləta || naliya || akaŋ || wulaf || kəːləp || yalip
|-
! leg
| ala || safiel || aŋ || tip || kelfek || rak
|-
! louse
| yimunə || watokəl || yimukun || kakyerk || yiməl || yimul
|-
! dog
| yimpa || nəmpo || yimpan || pat || yimpa || yimpak
|-
! pig
|  ||  ||  || bene ||  || 
|-
! bird
| ali || nol || alin || napet || kal || al
|-
! egg
| yoltə || nəŋkoi || yinalən || ponorire; yufəlip || yiplop || yulp
|-
! blood
| səna || xaməŋka || səneimpən || amk || komkok || yuwanip
|-
! bone
| pəniŋki || kamənaŋkil || lapən || lə || lekəl || yiklia
|-
! skin
| wiye || jiwota || yakən || wiyírk || saf || yikisiw
|-
! breast
| yimá || nəmai || yimawoŋ || nəmap || yimaŋkəf || yimán
|-
! tree
| nəmpə || numwol || nimpən || nip || nimp || nim
|-
! man
| makenti || kamwol || maikən || məsəmiyen || nyiŋkilpən || almias
|-
! woman
| simi || wukora || asək || ri || kekəntə || wasi
|-
! sun
| wa || wota || wan || waf || kentief || təkŋan
|-
! moon
| anyə || uni || ayen || wunɨ || keːnyif || mərəŋkil
|-
! water
| suku || wul || səpən || sup; wer || kuː || sulp
|-
! fire
| yimpu || ni || niŋ || nɨ; wetai || nif || niw
|-
! stone
| atauka ||  || səmpeiken || et; rubukia || kipru || pikiyap
|-
! one
|  ||  ||  || eso ||  || 
|-
! two
| piya || piyami || nantiyou || mantio; ru || poyomp || piyak
|}

References

 

 
Torricelli Range languages
Languages of Sandaun Province